Wieprz is a village in Żywiec County, Silesian Voivodeship, in southern Poland. It is the seat of the gmina (administrative district) called Gmina Radziechowy-Wieprz. The village has a population of 3,535.

It is one of the oldest villages in Żywiec Basin. It was first mentioned in Liber beneficiorum (1470-1480) as Wyeprze Maior and Wyeprze Minor.

References

Wieprz